Martino's Summer is a 2010 Italian drama film directed by Massimo Natale. It won the Audience Award at the 2011 Flaiano Prizes. It tells the story of a young man in southern Italy who has a romance with a vacationer from the north and learns to surf from an officer on a U.S. military base.

Cast 

 Treat Williams: Captain Jeff Clark
 Luigi Ciardo: Martino
 Matilde Maggio: Silvia (credited as Matilde Pezzotta)
 Simone Borrelli: Andrea
 Matteo Pianezzi: Luca

References

External links

2010s coming-of-age drama films
2010 films
Italian coming-of-age drama films
2010 directorial debut films
2010 drama films
2010s Italian films